"What Goes On" is a song by the Velvet Underground. It was the only single released from their 1969 eponymous third album.

The song was recorded in 1968 at T.T.G. Studios in Hollywood.

A concert performance of the song, with Doug Yule on keyboards, was included on their double live album 1969: The Velvet Underground Live.

Personnel

 Lou Reed – lead vocals, multi-tracked electric & acoustic guitars (including solo)
 Doug Yule – bass, Vox Continental organ, backing vocals
 Sterling Morrison – multi-tracked electric guitars (including solo)
 Maureen Tucker – drums

Cover versions
The Doctors of Madness used to play this song live in 1977–1978. Roxy Music singer Bryan Ferry performed "What Goes On" (with elements of "Beginning to See the Light") on his 1978 solo album The Bride Stripped Bare.

The "What Goes On" organ riff was used in the Talking Heads song "Once in a Lifetime," featured on their 1980 album Remain in Light.

It was also recorded by the Feelies on their 1988 album Only Life, Elizabeth Mitchell on her 2006 album You Are My Little Bird, The Screaming Trees on the 2009 compilation album Unpiecing the Jigsaw - A Tribute to The Velvet Underground and the Dils on numerous live albums.

Jim Kerr recorded it as the B-side to "Shadowland" in 2010, and later included it on the B-side to a 7" single included with the special edition of the Lostboy! AKA Jim Kerr CD.

Toy performed "What Goes On" for a Radio 6 Music session in 2012 and featured it on their Make It Mine EP released later that year.

Fanzine 
In 1978, aficionados Mike "MC" Kostek and Phil Milstein started the Velvet Underground Appreciation Society, which collected, cataloged and made available various rarities. They also published a fanzine titled "What Goes On", and later on a newsletter titled "What Goes On Jr."

References

Further reading 
 Le Velours Souterrain,  Velvet Underground fanzines
 Unterberger, Richie. White Light/White Heat The Velvet Underground Day By Day ; Jawbone Press; June 1, 2009; 
 Zak, Alban.The Velvet Underground Companion: Four Decades of Commentary; Schirmer Trade Books; November 1, 1997;

External links

The Velvet Underground songs
1969 songs
Songs written by Lou Reed
Songs about drugs